This is a list of rivers in Seychelles. Whereas some of these rivers are inland, others have an outlet towards the Somali Sea. This list is arranged by island, streams are listed clockwise starting from the north end of the island.

Mahé
Pointe Conan River
Rochon River
Cascade River
Du Cap River
Bougainville River
Caiman River
Dupuy River
Barbarons River

References
 GEOnet Names Server

External links 
   Includes information on rivers and river basins in the islands of Mahé, Praslin, and La Digue.

Seychelles
Rivers